This is a list of seasons played by Northamptonshire County Cricket Club in English cricket, from the club's formation to the most recent completed season. It details the club's achievements in major competitions, and the top run-scorers and wicket-takers for each season.

Seasons

Key

Division shown in bold when it changes due to promotion, relegation or league reorganisation.  Top run scorer/wicket taker shown in bold when he was the leading run scorer/wicket taker in the country.

Key to league record:
Div - division played in
P – games played
W – games won
L – games lost
D – games drawn
NR – games with no result
Abnd – games abandoned
Pts – points
Pos – final position

Key to rounds:
PR - preliminary round
R1 – first round
R2 – second round, etc.
QF – quarter-final
SF – semi-final
Grp – group stage
RU - runners-up
n/a – not applicable

Notes
A.  The National League competition did not start until the 1969 season, and ran until 2010. It was replaced, along with the Friends Provident Trophy, by the group format Clydesdale Bank 40.
B.  The Friends Provident Trophy competition did not start until the 1963 season, and for the 2010 was replaced by a group format named the Clydesdale Bank 40.
C.  The Benson & Hedges Cup competition did not start until the 1972 season, and ran until 2002.
D.  The Twenty20 Cup competition did not start until the 2003 season, and for the 2010 season changed to the FP T20.
E.  In County Championship matches only.
F.  The County Championship was split into two divisions in 2000.
G.  The National League was split into two divisions in 1999.
H.  Owing to the 1999 Cricket World Cup, the Benson & Hedges Cup was replaced by the Benson & Hedges Super Cup, which featured the top eight teams from the 1998 County Championship. Northamptonshire, finishing 15, did not qualify.

References

Seasons
Northamptonshire-related lists
Seasons, Northamptonshire County Cricket Club